Azumah Namoro Sanda (born 4 November 1956) is the member of Parliament for Chereponi in the Northern region of Ghana. He is a member of the Sixth Parliament of the Fourth Republic of Ghana representing the  Chereponi Constituency in the Northern Region on the ticket of the New Patriotic Party.

Early life and education 
Sanda was born on 4 November 1956 in Tiekasu in the Northern region. He earned a diploma in Basic Education at University of Education, Winneba in 2005.

Career 
Azumah is an educationist. He was District Coordinator, School from September, 2003 to January, 2009. He is a farmer.

Political career 
Sanda is a member of the New Patriotic Party (NPP). In 2012, he contested for the Chereponi seat on the ticket of the NPP sixth parliament of the fourth republic and won.

Personal life 
Sanda is married with nine children. He is a Muslim.

References 

1956 births
Living people
Ghanaian MPs 2013–2017
Ghanaian Muslims
New Patriotic Party politicians